John Robert Green (born in St. Louis, 1966/1967) is a former Executive Producer of Special Programming and Development at ABC News in New York City. Green is a three-time Emmy and prestigious Peabody Award winner. He produces many of the network's biggest newscast including Good Morning America, 20/20, and ABC World News Tonight with David Muir.

Biography
Green was raised in Olivette, Missouri. Green attended Washington University in St. Louis and Boston University. His career began as an intern at WCVB-TV in Boston. In June 1994, he joined ABC News as a field producer for Good Morning America. In 2014,  Green was named Executive Vice President, Programming & Development for Rock'n Robin Productions, a full service broadcast and digital production company founded by Robin Roberts.

In 2020, Green authored two children's books, "Dream Grabber", and "Dream Jumper", based on real bedtime rituals he created for his young children, along with a companion website.

Personal life
Green is fluent in Spanish and French. Green lives with his husband, Anthony, and their twin children in Holmdel Township, New Jersey.

References

External links
John R. Green | Team Rock'n Robin Productions
Author, https://timetodreambooks.com/ 
Guest, Becoming a Champion, https://www.youtube.com/watch?v=7uGiQbfnqZI&feature=youtu.be

Businesspeople from St. Louis
Emmy Award winners
ABC News
American television producers
Washington University in St. Louis alumni
Boston University College of Communication alumni
Peabody Award winners
American people of Jewish descent
1960s births

Living people
Year of birth uncertain